St Lawrence's Church, Whitwell is a  Grade I listed parish church in the Church of England in Whitwell, Derbyshire.

History

The church dates from the 12th century with elements from the 13th and 14th centuries. It was restored in 1885–1886 by John Loughborough Pearson who added a new roof of pitch pine. The stonework was repointed and the walls replastered. The west end gallery was removed and the box pews were replaced with open sittings of pitch pine. The floor was paved with wooden blocks and a new heating apparatus by Bacon and Co of London was installed.

Parish status
The church is in a joint parish with
All Saints’ Church, Streetly

Memorials
Roger Manners (d. 1632)

Organ

The organ was installed by Forster and Andrews dating from 1872. A specification of the organ can be found on the National Pipe Organ Register.

See also
Grade I listed churches in Derbyshire
Grade I listed buildings in Derbyshire
Listed buildings in Whitwell, Derbyshire

References

Church of England church buildings in Derbyshire
Grade I listed churches in Derbyshire